El maleficio 2: Los enviados del infierno, is a Mexican supernatural horror film produced by Televicine S.A. de C.V. and directed by Raúl Araiza. It is a sequel to the telenovela El maleficio. It stars Ernesto Alonso, Eduardo Yáñez and Lucía Méndez.

Synopses 
Enrique de Martino wants to locate Gabriel's haunted painting and looks for Rossetel, but since he has died he goes to his nephew Abel, who informs him that the painting is in a gallery, and tells him that when he finished painting it he lost his sight , so he believes that Gabriel has supernatural powers. A teacher of Gabriel tries to prevent it from Enrique. He meets Marcela, Gabriel's sister, and hypnotizes her so that she falls in love with him. She tells him that Gabriel's mother was pregnant by a strange being and that when she gave birth she died.

Cast 
Ernesto Alonso as Enrique de Martino
Lucía Méndez as Marcela
Eduardo Yáñez as Professor Andrés
Manuel Ojeda as Abel Romo
Juan Carlos Ruiz as Guillermo
María Teresa Rivas as Aunt
Alejandro Camacho as David
Antonio Monsell as Gabriel
Maria Zarattini as Ornella

Awards and nominations

References

External links 

Mexican supernatural horror films
1986 films
1980s Mexican films